La Scala is a live solo piano album by American pianist Keith Jarrett recorded in concert on February 13, 1995 at the Teatro alla Scala in Milan (Italy) and released by ECM Records in 1997.

Reception 

The AllMusic review by Scott Yanow awarded the album 4 stars, stating, "The music overall develops slowly but always holds one's interest, reinforcing one's viewpoint of Keith Jarrett as one of the top pianists of the 1980s and '90s."

The authors of The Penguin Guide to Jazz wrote: "Jarrett's improvisations are as long and as densely textured as ever, but there is a modesty and philosophical calm about the music which seems new. The second part of 'La Scala'... has outbreaks of quiet violence, but nothing that doesn't have its own resolution. The instrument is immaculate, warm and full-voiced."

Track listing 
All music by Keith Jarrett except as indicated.

 "La Scala, Part 1" - 44:54  
 "La Scala, Part 2" - 27:42  
 "Over the Rainbow" (Harold Arlen, E.Y. "Yip" Harburg) - 6:01

Total effective playing time: 1:16:34 (the album contains 2:04 applause approximately)

Personnel 
 Keith Jarrett – piano

Production
 Manfred Eicher - executive producer and engineer (remixing)
 Jan Erik Kongshaug - engineer (remixing)
 Judith Joy Ross - liner photography
 Mayo Bucher - cover graphic
 Michael Hofstetter - cover design

References 

Keith Jarrett live albums
1997 live albums
ECM Records live albums
Albums produced by Manfred Eicher
Instrumental albums
Solo piano jazz albums